The 2011–12 UEFA Europa League was the third season of the UEFA Europa League, Europe's secondary club football tournament organised by UEFA, and the 41st edition overall including its predecessor, the UEFA Cup. It began on 30 June 2011 with the first legs of the first qualifying round, and ended on 9 May 2012 with the final held at Arena Națională in Bucharest, Romania. As part of a trial that started in the 2009–10 UEFA Europa League, two extra officials – one on each goal line – were used in all matches of the competition from the group stage.

Atlético Madrid won the title, defeating Athletic Bilbao 3–0 in an all-Spanish final. Porto were the defending champions, but they were beaten by Manchester City in the Round of 32.

Association team allocation
A total of 194 teams from 53 UEFA associations participated in the 2011–12 UEFA Europa League. Associations are allocated places according to their 2010 UEFA country coefficients, which takes into account their performance in European competitions from 2005–06 to 2009–10.

Below is the qualification scheme for the 2011–12 UEFA Europa League:
Associations 1–6 each have three teams qualify
Associations 7–9 each have four teams qualify
Associations 10–51 each have three teams qualify, except Liechtenstein, which have one team qualify (as Liechtenstein only have a domestic cup and no domestic league)
Associations 52–53 each have two teams qualify
The top three associations of the 2010–11 UEFA Fair Play ranking each gain an additional berth
Moreover, 33 teams eliminated from the 2011–12 UEFA Champions League are transferred to the Europa League

Association ranking

Notes
(FP): Additional fair play berth (Norway, England, Sweden)
(UCL): Additional teams transferred from the UEFA Champions League

Distribution
Since the winners of the 2010–11 UEFA Europa League, Porto, qualified for the 2011–12 UEFA Champions League through domestic performance, the title holder spot reserved for them in the group stage was vacated. As a result, the following changes to the default allocation system were made to compensate for the vacant title holder spot in the group stage:
The domestic cup winners of associations 16 and 17 (Scotland and Bulgaria) were promoted from the third qualifying round to the play-off round. 
The domestic cup winners of associations 28 and 29 (Belarus and Republic of Ireland) were promoted from the second qualifying round to the third qualifying round.
The domestic cup winners of associations 52 and 53 (Malta and San Marino) and the domestic league runners-up of associations 33 and 34 (Latvia and Moldova) were promoted from the first qualifying round to the second qualifying round.

Redistribution rules
A Europa League place is vacated when a team qualifies for both the Champions League and the Europa League, or qualifies for the Europa League by more than one method. When a place is vacated, it is redistributed within the national association by the following rules:
 When the domestic cup winners (considered as the "highest-placed" qualifiers within the national association) also qualify for the Champions League, their Europa League place is vacated, and the remaining Europa League qualifiers are moved up one place, with the final place (with the earliest starting round) taken by the domestic cup runners-up, provided they do not already qualify for the Champions League or the Europa League. Otherwise, this place is taken by the highest-placed league finishers that have not yet qualified for the Europa League.
 When the domestic cup winners also qualify for the Europa League through league position, their place through the league position is vacated, and the Europa League qualifiers that finish lower in the league are moved up one place, with the final place taken by the highest-placed league finishers that have not yet qualified for the Europa League.
 A place vacated by the League Cup winners is taken by the highest-placed league finishers that have not yet qualified for the Europa League.
 A Fair Play place is taken by the highest-ranked team in the domestic Fair Play table that has not yet qualified for the Champions League or the Europa League.

Teams
The labels in the parentheses show how each team qualified for the place of its starting round:
 TH: Title holders
 CW: Cup winners
 CR: Cup runners-up
 LC: League Cup winners
 Nth: League position
 P-W: End-of-season European competition play-offs winners
 FP: Fair play
 UCL: Relegated from the Champions League
 GS: Third-placed teams from the group stage
 PO: Losers from the play-off round
 Q3: Losers from the third qualifying round

Notes
TH – Title holders: Porto qualified for the 2011–12 UEFA Champions League group stage as the champions of the 2010–11 Primeira Liga. They finished third in their group and thus advanced to the 2011–12 UEFA Europa League knockout phase.
Republic of Ireland (IRL): Because Sporting Fingal, the fourth-placed team of the 2010 League of Ireland Premier Division, returned its domestic license prior to the start of the 2011 season, St Patricks Athletic, the fifth-placed team of the league, claimed the Europa League spot in the first qualifying round.
Kazakhstan (KAZ): Because Lokomotiv Astana, the winners of the 2010 Kazakhstan Cup, did not exist for at least three years and could not obtain a UEFA license, the second-placed team of the league, Aktobe, moved up to enter the second qualifying round, and the cup runners-up, Shakhter Karagandy, claimed the vacant Europa League spot in the first qualifying round.
Lithuania (LTU): Because Žalgiris Vilnius, the third-placed team of the 2010 A Lyga, did not obtain a UEFA license for the 2011–12 European competitions, Tauras Tauragė, the fourth-placed team of the league, claimed the Europa League spot in the second qualifying round.
Romania (ROU): Because Politehnica Timișoara, the 2010–11 Liga I runners-up, were denied a domestic licence for the 2011–12 season, Vaslui, the third-placed team of the league, claimed the Champions League spot in the third qualifying round for non-champions, instead of entering the Europa League play-off round. Subsequently, Rapid București and Dinamo București, the fourth- and sixth-placed teams of the league, moved up to enter the play-off round and the third qualifying round respectively, and Gaz Metan Mediaș, the seventh-placed team of the league, claimed the vacant Europa League spot in the second qualifying round.
Turkey (TUR): Fenerbahçe, the 2010–11 Süper Lig champions, was banned by the Turkish Football Federation on 24 August 2011 from participating in the 2011–12 UEFA Champions League due to the ongoing investigation into match-fixing. UEFA decided to replace them in the 2011–12 UEFA Champions League with Trabzonspor, the league runners-up, who had lost in the Champions League third qualifying round and were participating in the Europa League play-off round at that time. They finished third in their group and thus advanced to the 2011–12 UEFA Europa League knockout phase.

Round and draw dates
All draws held at UEFA headquarters in Nyon, Switzerland unless stated otherwise.

Matches in the qualifying, play-off, and knockout rounds may also be played on Tuesdays or Wednesdays instead of the regular Thursdays due to scheduling conflicts.

Qualifying rounds

In the qualifying rounds and the play-off round, teams were divided into seeded and unseeded teams based on their 2011 UEFA club coefficients, and then drawn into two-legged home-and-away ties. Teams from the same association cannot be drawn against each other.

First qualifying round
The draw for the first and second qualifying rounds was held on 20 June 2011. The first legs were played on 30 June, and the second legs were played on 7 July 2011.

|}

Notes
Note 1: Order of legs reversed after original draw.

Second qualifying round
The first legs were played on 14 July, and the second legs were played on 21 July 2011.

|}

Notes
Note 2: Order of legs reversed after original draw.

Third qualifying round
The draw for the third qualifying round was held on 15 July 2011. The first legs were played on 26 and 28 July, and the second legs were played on 4 August 2011.

 

|}

Notes
Note 3: Order of legs reversed after original draw.

Play-off round

The draw for the play-off round was held on 5 August 2011. The first legs were played on 18 August, and the second legs were played on 25 August 2011.

|}

Notes
Note 4: Order of legs reversed after original draw.
Note 5: Greek club Olympiacos Volos, who had reached the play-off round, were excluded from the competition by UEFA on 11 August 2011 for their involvement in the Koriopolis match-fixing scandal. UEFA decided to replace them in the play-off round with Differdange 03 from Luxembourg, who had lost to Olympiakos Volou in the previous round.
Note 6: As a result of match-fixing allegations, Turkish club Fenerbahçe were removed from the 2011–12 UEFA Champions League and were replaced with Trabzonspor on 24 August 2011. As a result, Trabzonspor's second leg against Athletic Bilbao was cancelled, and Athletic Bilbao qualified for the group stage.
Note 7: Celtic lodged protests over the eligibility of a number of the Sion players who participated in the two legs of the play-off round, which Sion won 3–1 aggregate (first leg: 0–0; second leg: 3–1). The UEFA Control and Disciplinary Body accepted the protests and decided to award both matches to Celtic by forfeit (3–0). As a consequence, Celtic qualified for the UEFA Europa League group stage.

Group stage

The group stage features 48 teams, which were allocated into pots based on their 2011 UEFA club coefficients, and then drawn into twelve groups of four.  Teams from the same association cannot be drawn against each other. The draw was held on 26 August 2011 in Monaco.

In each group, teams play against each other home-and-away in a round-robin format. The matchdays are 15 September, 29 September, 20 October, 3 November, 30 November – 1 December, and 14–15 December 2011. The group winners and runners-up advanced to the round of 32, where they were joined by the 8 third-placed teams from the group stage of the 2011–12 UEFA Champions League.

If two or more teams are equal on points on completion of the group matches, the following criteria are applied to determine the rankings (in descending order):
higher number of points obtained in the group matches played among the teams in question;
superior goal difference from the group matches played among the teams in question;
higher number of goals scored in the group matches played among the teams in question;
higher number of goals scored away from home in the group matches played among the teams in question;
If, after applying criteria 1) to 4) to several teams, two teams still have an equal ranking, the criteria 1) to 4) will be reapplied to determine the ranking of these teams;
superior goal difference from all group matches played;
higher number of goals scored from all group matches played;
higher number of coefficient points accumulated by the club in question, as well as its association, over the previous five seasons.

A total of 24 national associations are represented in this group stage (including Scotland after Celtic were reinstated into the Europa League over Sion), with England having the most teams, with four. This was also the first time Irish side were represented in the group stage.

Group A

Group B

Group C

Group D

Group E

Group F

Group G

Group H

Group I

Group J

Group K

Group L

Knockout phase 

In the knockout phase, teams play against each other over two legs on a home-and-away basis, except for the one-match final. The draw for the round of 32 and round of 16 was held on 16 December 2011. The draws for the quarter-finals, semi-finals and final (to determine the "home" team) were held on 16 March 2012. Both draws were assisted by Romanian footballer Miodrag Belodedici, the ambassador for the 2012 final.

In the draw for the round of 32, the twelve group winners and the four better third-placed teams from the Champions League group stage (based on their match record in the group stage) are seeded, and the twelve group runners-up and the other four third-placed teams from the Champions League group stage are unseeded. A seeded team is drawn against an unseeded team, with the seeded team hosting the second leg. Teams from the same group or the same association cannot be drawn against each other. In the draws for the round of 16 onwards, there are no seedings, and teams from the same group or the same association may be drawn with each other.

Bracket

Round of 32 
The first legs were played on 14 and 16 February, and the second legs were played on 22 and 23 February 2012.

Round of 16 
The first legs were played on 8 March, and the second legs were played on 15 March 2012.

Quarter-finals 
The first legs were played on 29 March, and the second legs on 5 April 2012.

Semi-finals 
The first legs were played on 19 April, and the second legs were played on 26 April 2012.

Final 

The 2012 UEFA Europa League Final was played on 9 May 2012 at the Arena Națională in Bucharest, Romania.

Statistics

Excluding qualifying rounds and play-off round.

Top goalscorers

Source:

Top assists

Source:

See also
 2011–12 UEFA Champions League
 2012 UEFA Super Cup

References

External links

UEFA Europa League (official website)

 
2
2011-12